The auditor of public accounts of Nebraska, more commonly known as the "state auditor", is an elected constitutional officer in the executive branch of the U.S. state of Nebraska. Twenty-five individuals have held the office of auditor of public accounts since statehood. The current auditor is Mike Foley, a Republican.

Powers and duties
The auditor of public accounts has the constitutional authority to audit all state fiscal activity and the fiduciary responsibility to promulgate audit standards applicable to all state agencies and local governments. To this end, the Office of the Auditor of Public Accounts (APA) engages in financial audits of every state agency, officer, board, bureau and commission, conducts the annual single audit of federal awards received by the state, and investigates both reported and alleged waste, fraud, and mismanagement throughout state and local government. 

With respect to local governments, APA annually audits the accounts of most counties and each educational service district, registers school, municipal and public bonds, and prescribes uniform accounting and budgeting systems for all political subdivisions in Nebraska. Financial audits of all other local governments are generally prepared by private-sector auditors and reviewed by APA staff for compliance with the law and the duly promulgated audit standards.

Aside from financial audits, APA also conducts performance audits of local governments receiving more than $25,000 of state aid in any fiscal year and of state agencies when directed by the state legislature. These audits provide critical information to state lawmakers on the economy, efficiency, and effectiveness of public programs and influence public policy debates.

List of territorial auditors

List of state auditors
Parties

Notes

References

Nebraska